Glen Falls may refer to:

 Glen Falls (New York), a small waterfall in Williamsville, New York
 Glen Falls (North Carolina), a large waterfall in the Nantahala National Forest near Highlands, North Carolina
 Glens Falls, New York, a city in the U.S. state of New York